Carl Martin Erik Larsson (born 20 September 1996), better known as Rekkles (pronounced "reckless"), is a Swedish professional League of Legends player for Fnatic. He has played for Fnatic, Alliance, Elements, G2 Esports, and Karmine Corp.

Originally from Älvängen, near Gothenburg, Rekkles lives in Berlin during the LEC season. Rekkles lived in the Fnatic gaming house in 2013. He became interested in video games after he injured his cruciate ligament playing football.

His esport career took start in 2012, and played for League of Legends teams Playing Ducks, PAH, Team BLACK (as a substitute) and SK Gaming. In November 2012 he joined Fnatic as their starting Marksman. Rekkles' young age has limited him however, when it prevented him from being able to play in the 2013 EU LCS for Fnatic. Because he could not take part in the LCS, a secondary Fnatic squad, Fnatic.Beta, was created around him.  However, the team was disbanded after a few months. In May 2013 he started playing together with YoungBuck, Shook v2, cowTard, and Unlimited as PrideFC, and after the team got signed by Copenhagen Wolves, he agreed to continue playing with them as a stand-in. Together Fnatic decided that it will be best for him to rejoin the roster in the 2014 Season due to him not being eligible to play until after the group stage.

On 22 November in 2013, Rekkles officially retook the starting Marksman position from puszu.

Rekkles returned to Fnatic for the 2015 Summer EU LCS. They went undefeated all summer and won the playoffs in August, qualifying for the 2015 League of Legends World Championship. In the 2016 Spring EU LCS, they made it to the semifinals.

Overall he has played in 7 international S-tier tournaments. (6x World Championship and 1x MSI)

He is best known for playing Vayne, Kennen, Syndra, Tristana, Sivir and Jhin. He is the first player to have reached both 1,000 and 2,000 kills in the LEC and the European player with the most pentakills (10). He is considered the best AD Carry player in European history and one of the best in the world.

Rekkles' trademark is the large number of tattoos on his body.

Professional career

Early career 
Rekkles competitive career started at age 16 with the teams Playing Ducks and PAH. He was also as a substitute player for both Team BLACK and SK Gaming.

Fnatic 
His performance allowed him in November 2012 to join Fnatic as their starting AD Carry. Because of age restrictions in the European version of the League Championship Series he was not yet allowed to play for Fnatic in the EU LCS. At first a new team with the name "Fnatic.Beta" was formed around him, but after a few month it was disbanded. Rekkles briefly left Fnactic then to play for various teams with the agreement to join again for the 2014 season, in which he would be eligible to play. On 22 November 2013, Rekkles officially retook the AD Carry position.

During the 4th season, Rekkles and Fnatic participated in the IEM Season VIII - World Championship, and ended up second place after losing to KT Rolster Bullets during the Grand Finale.

At the beginning of 2014 season Spring Split, Rekkles played very well and received the MVP prize weekly. Fnatic had won each of their four superweek games, and this was mainly due to the great performance of Rekkles playing Jinx. They ended the Spring split in 2nd place, losing to SK Gaming, but secured themselves a spot in the Spring Playoffs. The whole team raised their game for the playoffs, and they emerged victorious after a win against Alliance in their semifinals matchup, and against SK Gaming in the Grand Final.

Fnatic endured a rocky start during the beginning of the Summer Split. They could not make it into the top 2 until Week 7 of the Split, while their main rivals Alliance were already at considerable distance ahead of them in the race for 1st place. Throughout the games, Rekkles managed to impress with his plays with Lucian and Vayne, picking up the Weekly MVP Award for Week 9.

Alliance/Elements 
On 24 November 2014, Rekkles joined Alliance as starting AD carry, after many rumours. His first event with Alliance was IEM San Jose. During the IEM, Fnatic ended up in the semifinals, however team lost their match against Cloud9 and placed third after playing against Team SoloMid. During the event, Rekkles was nominated for the MVP award along with PowerOfEvil, Vizicsacsi, Kikis, and Sneaky; however the final vote went to Sneaky.

In order to comply with new LCS regulations, Alliance would have to change their name for the upcoming season. On 8 January, it was announced that the team had rebranded as Elements. The Spring Split was not a success for the team as they finished 7th place after making a number of roster changes. Therefore, the team did not made it to the playoffs, however they did qualify for the Summer Split.

Return to Fnatic 
On 14 May 2015, Rekkles rejoined Fnatic. He was a part of the Fnatic roster that managed to finish the regular season with an unbeaten 18–0 record and become the first team to achieve this in League Championship Series history. He won the EU LCS championship after beating Origen, 3–2.

In 2018, Rekkles won both the Spring and Summer Split EU LCS championships. In both splits, he secured a spot on the 1st All-Pro Team.

He was a part of the team's 2018 World Championship run, where they became the first Western team since Season 1 to advance to the finals.

G2 Esports 
In November 2020, Rekkles' contract in Fnatic had expired. He decided to move on from Fnatic to G2 Esports, where the spot for AD Carry was open after Perkz had left the team to play in the LCS.

At the beginning of the Spring Season of the League of Legends European Championship, a song dedicated to Rekkles titled Reckless with my heart was released by the LEC casters. The single is about Rekkles abandoning Fnatic, where he was a long time veteran, to join G2 Esports.

After a poor 2021 season, G2 Esports' CEO Carlos "ocelote" Rodríguez placed Rekkles on the buyout market.

Karmine Corp 
Rekkles settled in the European regional league LFL with team Karmine Corp. While playing in the LFL in his first split he finished 3rd and won the EU Masters tournament. However, in the following split, Karmine Corp finished 6th in the LFL, unable to qualify for the EU Masters Summer tournament.

Fnatic 
After spending one year on the ERL scene with Karmine Corp, Rekkles returned to the LEC. On 15 December 2022, he officially switched to the Fnatic team, where he had previously played twice for a long period of time.

Achievements

European

International

Individual Awards
 4x LEC MVP (Summer 2014, Summer 2017, Spring 2018, Spring 2021)
 6x LEC All-Pro First Team (Summer 2015, Summer 2017, Spring 2018, Spring 2020, Spring 2021, Summer 2021)
 1x LEC All-Pro Second Team (Spring 2017)
 4x LEC All-Pro Third Team (Summer 2016, Spring 2019, Summer 2019, Summer 2020)

Notes

References

External links 
 
 
 

Fnatic players
Alliance (esports) players
Elements (esports) players
Swedish esports players
Living people
1996 births
League of Legends AD Carry players
Sportspeople from Berlin
People from Ale Municipality
Swedish expatriates in Germany
Twitch (service) streamers
Sportspeople from Västra Götaland County